Uzu (渦) (English: Vortex) is the tenth single by the Japanese pop-rock band Porno Graffitti, it was released on February 5, 2003. TV Asahi Friday night drama "Skyhigh" theme song and NHK "Pop Jam" ending theme.

Track listing

References

2003 singles
Porno Graffitti songs
2003 songs
SME Records singles